The 2004 Carlisle City Council election took place on 10 June 2004 to elect members of Carlisle District Council in Cumbria, England. One third of the council was up for election and the council stayed under no overall control.

After the election, the composition of the council was:
Labour 24
Conservative 20
Liberal Democrats 7
Independent 1

Election result
Labour became the largest party on the council with 24 councillors, but without a majority, after gaining 3 seats from the Conservatives in Belle Vue, St Aidans and Yewdale. However Labour did lose one seat to the Liberal Democrats in Castle, with the Liberal Democrats also gaining a seat from the Conservatives in Dalston by 1 vote. This meant the Conservatives dropped to 20 seats, while the Liberal Democrats went up to 7 and there remained 1 independent. Overall turnout at the election was 42.6%, up from 31.4% in 2003.

Following the election the Liberal Democrats continued to back the Conservatives to run the council, with Mike Mitchelson remaining as leader of the council.

Ward results

By-elections between 2004 and 2006
A by-election was held on 24 November 2005 in Castle ward after the death of the Liberal Democrat group leader John Guest. Olwyn Luckley held the seat for the Liberal Democrats, who continued to hold the balance of power on the council.

References

2004 English local elections
2004
2000s in Cumbria